Crédit Mutuel is a French cooperative banking group, one of the country's top five banks with over 30 million customers. It traces its origins back to the German cooperative movement inspired by Friedrich Wilhelm Raiffeisen in Alsace–Lorraine under German rule, in the 1880s. Crédit Mutuel was a member of the International Raiffeisen Union (IRU).

History

The first local cooperative bank inspired by the Raiffeisen system on what is now French territory was created in February 1882 in La Wantzenau, a village near Strasbourg. The network in German-ruled Alsace–Lorraine grew quickly to 127 local banks in 1892, and 471 in 1914.

Following France's recovery of Alsace-Lorraine after World War I, some of the local banks joined the Crédit Agricole network, while others preferred to maintain their Raiffeisen identity and adopted the Crédit Mutuel name. The  (BFCM) in Strasbourg was established in 1919 as a financial entity for the reorganized network.

In 2008, Crédit Mutuel bought Citibank's retail bank activities in Germany for 5.2 billion euros. Citibank Germany had over 3 million clients and 7% of the market share in Germany. Citibank sold multiple retail units across Europe and the world to reduce risk and focus on core activities like corporate and investment banking. The German network was subsequently rebranded Targobank.

Organization

The Crédit Mutuel group has a decentralized structure, despite being designated as a single significant institution under European banking supervision. The CNCM was headquartered from 1981 to 2020 at 88–90, rue Cardinet in Paris, and in 2020 moved to a newly erected building at 46, Rue du Bastion near the high-rise Tribunal judiciaire de Paris.

In France, the group's main retail network is formed of around 2,000 individual local Crédit Mutuel banks, which are owned by their customers in line with the Raiffeisen system. These local cooperative banks are grouped into 18 regional federations and one nationwide agricultural federation.

Crédit Mutuel Alliance Fédérale

Since 2011, a number of regional federations have formed a quasi-national grouping led by the CMCEE, initially called the "CM11" and known since 2018 as the Crédit Mutuel Alliance Fédérale, which as of early 2022 brings together 14 of the 18 regional federations plus the nationwide agricultural federation.

The BFCM in turns owns most of the group's assets beyond the network of local cooperative banks, both in France and abroad. Other affiliates outside of France include: 
 Banque de Luxembourg in Luxembourg
 Targobank in Germany and Spain
 51% of Beobank in Belgium, with the remaining 49% held by regional federations of Crédit Mutuel in France
 a 35% stake in Banque de Tunisie in Tunisia
 a 25% stake in Bank of Africa in Morocco

Crédit Mutuel Arkéa and other federations

Arkéa also has specialized financial services subsidiaries mirroring those of the BFCM, as well as an online bank, which it acquired in 2006, and the Belgian Keytrade Bank, acquired in 2016.

Caisse Centrale du Crédit Mutuel

Its capital structure is a reflection of the Crédit Mutuel group's structure.

Motto

Crédit Mutuel's corporate motto is "La banque qui appartient à ses clients, ça change tout!" ("The bank owned by its customers, that changes everything!")

Controversy

Check processing fees
In 2010 the French government's Autorité de la concurrence (the department in charge of regulating competition) fined eleven banks, including Crédit Mutuel, the sum of €384,900,000 for colluding to charge unjustified fees on check processing, especially for extra fees charged during the transition from paper check transfer to "Exchanges Check-Image" electronic transfer.

CIC and the National Bank of Haiti

Crédit Mutuel's subsidiary the Crédit Industriel et Commercial (CIC), known for having helped finance the construction of the Eiffel Tower, played a controversial role in extracting income from Haiti and transferring the wealth into France at around the same time. According to a 2022 New York Times investigation into France's colonial legacy in Haiti, the bank benefited loan and concession arrangements with the Haitian Government that required the latter to transfer to CIC and its partners nearly half of all taxes the government collected on exports. By "effectively choking off the nation’s primary source of income," the CIC "left a crippling legacy of financial extraction and dashed hopes — even by the standards of a nation with a long history of both."

See also

 List of investors in Bernard L. Madoff Investment Securities
Other banking networks derived from the Raiffeisen system: 
 Raiffeisen Bankengruppe in Austria
 German Cooperative Financial Group in Germany
 KBC Group in Belgium
 Banque Raiffeisen in Luxembourg
 Rabobank in the Netherlands
 Raiffeisen (Switzerland)

References

External links
 Credit Mutuel bank profile

French brands
Crédit Mutuel
Banks under direct supervision of the European Central Bank